The 2008 Telus Cup was Canada's 30th annual national midget 'AAA' hockey championship, played April 21–27, 2008 at Arnprior, Ontario.  The Sudbury Nickel Capital Wolves defeated the Winnipeg Thrashers 6-4 in the gold medal game to win their first national title.  The Blizzard de Sèminiaire Saint-François from Quebec picked up their second consecutive bronze medal.  Current Vegas Golden Knights forward Mark Stone, playing for the Thrashers, was the tournament's top scorer.

Teams

Round robin

Standings

Scores

Saint-François 3 - Cole Harbour 1
Winnipeg 3 - Calgary 0
Sudbury 6 - Ottawa Valley 4
Winnipeg 5 - Saint-François 2
Calgary 2 - Sudbury 2
Cole Harbour 1 - Ottawa Valley 1
Sudbury 3 - Saint-François 2
Winnipeg 4 - Cole Harbour 3
Calgary 5 - Ottawa Valley 1
Sudbury 3 - Cole Harbour 0
Calgary 1 - Saint-François 0
Winnipeg 6 - Ottawa Valley 3
Cole Harbour 4 - Calgary 3
Winnipeg 5 - Sudbury 4
Saint-François 9 - Ottawa Valley 1

Playoffs

Semi-finals
Winnipeg 4 - Saint-François 1
Sudbury 5 - Calgary 2

Bronze-medal game
Saint-François 7 - Calgary 2

Gold-medal game
Sudbury 6 - Winnipeg 4

Individual awards
Most Valuable Player: Mathew Bodie (Winnipeg)
Top Scorer: Mark Stone (Winnipeg)
Top Forward: Mattieu Lecours (Sudbury)
Top Defenceman: Mathew Bodie (Winnipeg)
Top Goaltender: Kris Moore (Calgary
Most Sportsmanlike Player: Jordan Burke (Cole Harbour)

See also
Telus Cup

External links
2008 Telus Cup Home Page
Hockey Canada-Telus Cup Guide and Record Book

Telus Cup
Telus Cup
April 2008 sports events in Canada
Ice hockey competitions in Ontario
2008 in Ontario